New Zealand political leader Jenny Shipley assembled a "shadow cabinet" within the National Party caucus after her election to the position of Leader of the Opposition in 1999. She composed this of individuals who acted for the party as spokespeople in assigned roles while she was Leader of the Opposition (1999–2001).

As the National Party formed the largest party not in government at the time, the frontbench team was as a result the Official Opposition within the New Zealand House of Representatives.

Frontbench team
The list below contains a list of Shipley's spokespeople and their respective roles as announced in December 1999.

References

New Zealand National Party
Shipley, Jenny
1999 establishments in New Zealand
2001 disestablishments in New Zealand